Boughton Heath is a village located inside the civil parish Great Boughton in Chester, Cheshire, England.
The village is home to two primary schools, Boughton Heath Primary School and Cherry Grove Primary School as well the one secondary school, Bishops' Blue Coat Church of England High School. It also is home to a special school, Dee Banks School. The Village also has many shops and is home to half of the Caldy Valley Nature Reserve. Other popular sites are the Sandy Lane Aqua Park and The Meadows across the River Dee.

Villages in Cheshire